Calderite is a mineral in the garnet group with the chemical formula (Mn2+, Ca)3(Fe3+, Al)2(SiO4)3.

It is dark reddish brown to dark yellowish in color and generally granular massive in form.

It was named for geologist James Calder who worked on the geology of India. The name was first applied to a rock in manganese deposits in Katkamsandi, Hazaribagh district, Bihar and at Netra, Balaghat district, Madhya Pradesh, India.
later transferred to its predominant mineral. In 1909 it was described as a mineral from Otjosondu, Otjozondjupa Region, Namibia.

See also

References

Manganese(II) minerals
Iron(III) minerals
Calcium minerals
Aluminium minerals
Garnet group
Cubic minerals
Minerals in space group 230